Sharp House may refer to:

in Japan
Sharp House (Kobe), designed by Alexander Nelson Hansell, an Important Cultural Property of Japan

in the United States
(by state then city)
M. J. Sharp House, Phoenix, Arizona, listed on the National Register of Historic Places (NRHP) in Phoenix
Corbit-Sharp House, Odessa, Delaware, listed on the NRHP in New Castle County
Bonner-Sharp-Gunn House, Carrollton, Georgia, listed on the NRHP in Carroll County
Hil'ardin/Sharp-Hardin-Wright House, Forsyth, Georgia, listed on the NRHP in Monroe County
Mathias Sharp House, Rockport, Indiana, listed on the NRHP in Spencer County
Joseph McCoun-D.S. Sharp House, Bondville/Salvisa, Kentucky, listed on the NRHP in Mercer County
Sharp House (Lancaster, Kentucky), listed on the National Register of Historic Places in Garrard County
Ella Sharp House, Jackson, Michigan, listed on the NRHP in Jackson County
John Sharp House, Stevensville, Montana, listed on the NRHP in Ravalli County
Edward Sharp House, Camden, New Jersey, listed on the NRHP in Camden County
Eanger Irving Couse House and Studio—Joseph Henry Sharp Studios, Taos, New Mexico, listed on the NRHP in Taos County
Sharp Brothers House, Guilderland, New York, listed on the NRHP in Albany County
Sharp Farmhouse, Guilderland, New York, listed on the NRHP in Albany County
Morris Sharp House, Washington Court House, Ohio, listed on the NRHP in Fayette County
Samuel Sharp House, Ashley, Ohio, listed on the NRHP in Delaware County
Stephen Sharp House, Westerville, Ohio, listed on the NRHP in Delaware County
Sharp-Page House, Columbus, Ohio, listed on the NRHP in Columbus
Edward F. Sharp Residential Ensemble, The Dalles, Oregon, listed on the NRHP in Wasco County
Elisha Sharp House, Ten Mile, Tennessee, listed on the NRHP in Meigs County
Sharp House (Ennis, Texas), listed on the National Register of Historic Places in Ellis County
John C. Sharp House, Vernon, Utah, listed on the NRHP in Tooele County
Sharp's Oakland, Doswell, Virginia, listed on the NRHP in Hanover County
James Sharp House, Yakima, Washington, listed on the NRHP in Yakima County

See also
Sharpe House (disambiguation)